Karl Humenberger (25 October 1906 – 28 December 1989) was an Austrian association football player and manager, the brother of fellow player Ferdinand Humenberger.

Club career
Born in Vienna, Humenberger played in Austria for Floridsdorfer AC and Admira Vienna, in Switzerland for FC Zürich, and in France for RC Strasbourg and AS Saint-Étienne.

International career
Humenberger earned one cap for the Austrian national side in 1928.

Coaching career
Humenberger managed in a number of European countries, including Austria (with SC Ortmann and Austria Salzburg), the Netherlands (with Ajax), and in Belgium (with Royal Antwerp). With Ajax he won the championship in the first professional season (1956–57).

Personal life
Karl was born in Vienna, the son of Auguste Stroh and Ferdinand Humenberger. He was married to Emilie Janata.

References

1906 births
1989 deaths
Footballers from Vienna
Association football midfielders
Austria international footballers
Austrian footballers
Austrian football managers
Austrian expatriate football managers
RC Strasbourg Alsace players
AS Saint-Étienne players
FC Zürich players
Ligue 1 players
AFC Ajax managers
FC Dordrecht managers
Royal Antwerp F.C. managers
FC Red Bull Salzburg managers
Eredivisie managers
Austrian expatriate footballers
Austrian expatriate sportspeople in France
Expatriate footballers in France
Expatriate footballers in Switzerland
Austrian expatriate sportspeople in the Netherlands
Austrian expatriate sportspeople in Belgium
Austrian expatriate sportspeople in Switzerland